Video Modeling is an evidence-based practice that uses video recording to present the learner with a skill to observe and learn.

Video modeling (VM) is a mode of teaching that uses video recording and display equipment to provide a visual model of the targeted behaviors or skill. In video self-modeling (VSM), individuals observe themselves performing a behavior successfully on video, and then imitate the targeted behavior. Video modeling has been used to teach many skills, including social skills, communication, and athletic performance; it has shown promise as an intervention for children with autism spectrum disorders (ASD). Important practical and theoretical questions remain largely unanswered about video modeling and other forms of video-based intervention. Video modeling has theoretical roots in the social learning theory work of Bandura (1969), which called attention to the ability to learn through observation (McCoy, K., & Hermansen, E. (2007).   

How to create a video model:

 Identify the desired behavior or skill that you want to teach.
 Select actor(s) who can demonstrate the behavior or skill.
 Record a video of actor(s) demonstrating the behavior or skill.
 Play the video for the desired group of individual to learn the behavior or skill.

Classification 
Video modeling is a form of video-based intervention (VBI); other forms include video prompting, computer-based video instruction, and video priming. Several dimensions of effectiveness have been identified for VBI, but important questions regarding VBI remain largely unanswered, both practically and theoretically. The term was developed by filmmaker James Stanfield in 1999 for a "series of video tapes that teach appropriate social behavior to special education students, by use of professional actors and actresses who demonstrate appropriate behavior (wrong way/right way)".

The National Clearinghouse on Autism Evidence and Practice describes:

Video modeling as an evidence based practice (EBP). The effectiveness of video modeling is higher with elementary school children, age range of 6-11. This EBP has success with ages from toddlers to young adults ranging in effectiveness. There are several types of video modeling, including adult or peer as video model, video self-modeling, point-of-view video modeling, video prompting, and video feedback.Video modeling has provides an opportunity to the learner to watch a recording of the target behavior or skill then practice when provided the chance.

Autism 
Researchers Kathleen Mccoy and Emily Hermansen observe: 
 
       Video modeling is particularly effective in ABA programs in teaching behaviors to children with autism (Nikopoulos & Keenan, 2006). Video technology is one facet of positive behavior supports for individuals with disabilities (Sturmey, 2003).... Video modeling is innately appealing to instructors who find live modeling to be very time consuming. Charlop-Christy, Le, and Freeman (2000) found that video modeling resulted in quicker rates of acquisition and increases in generalization in comparison to live modeling. Video modeling is also more cost efficient and requires less time for training and implementation than in vivo (live) modeling (Graetz, Mastropieri, & Scruggs, 2006)....Additional benefits to video modeling include an increased ability to gain and hold the student's attention as well as the ability to have complete control over the observed stimuli (Dorwrick, 1991).

Video modeling has been proven to successfully teach empathy, or perspective, where other methods have failed. The ability to be able to "see things from another person's point of view" is termed theory of mind by the research community (ToM; Happe et al., 1996). This ability is well developed by the age of 4 in typical children, but appears to be delayed or absent altogether in children with ASD. Researchers Marjorie H. Charlop-Christy and Sabrina Daneshvar observe:

Video modeling was used to teach perspective taking to three children with autism....Generalization across untrained similar stimuli was also assessed. Video modeling was a fast and effective tool for teaching perspective-taking tasks to children with autism, resulting in both stimulus and response generalization. These results concurred with previous research that perspective taking can be taught. Unlike other studies, however, wider ranges of generalization were found.

This study is significant as it illustrates the increased generalization, or continued natural use of a learned skill.  This effect has been witnessed in areas ranging from the teaching of conversation to pretend play to purchasing skills using video modeling.

A specific form of video modeling based on the discrete trial method of applied behavior analysis was developed and documented by Laura Kasbar in 2000 as a way to teach children who do not respond well to other kinds of therapy, including traditional applied behavior analysis (ABA). Kasbar in 2000, and then Dunn and Dunn in 2006, recognized that the precepts of ABA, most notably the very controlled or "discrete" presentation of desired information could be more effectively taught using the video medium rather than in vivo (Dunn and Dunn, 2006).  Using this method, retention of the information taught is greatly increased. Video modeling was also shown to be an effective way to teach older children, when many other therapy methods have been ineffectual. This work was furthered in the study, "Using Video-Enhanced Activity Schedules and Matrix Training to Teach Sociodramatic Play to a Child with Autism" by Melissa Dauphin, Elisabeth M. Kinney, Robert Stromer in their study which demonstrated video modeling's ability to improve and encourage non-scripted interaction and communication. Chistos K. Nikopoulos (2007) found that video modeling could be used to produce generalized social skills.

See also
Autism therapies
Educational technology
Feedforward, Behavioral and Cognitive Science

References

External links
Watching videos can help children with autism learn social skills Indiana University

Treatment of autism
Educational psychology